The 1977–78 Soviet Championship League season was the 32nd season of the Soviet Championship League, the top level of ice hockey in the Soviet Union. 10 teams participated in the league, and CSKA Moscow won the championship.

Regular season

Relegation 
 SKA Leningrad – Sibir Novosibirsk 6:2, 6:3

External links
Season on hockeystars.ru

1977–78 in Soviet ice hockey
Soviet League seasons
Sov